Sabine Lohmann (born 13 March 1973) is a German former professional tennis player.

Lohmann played on the professional tour in the early 1990s, reaching a best singles ranking of 184 in the world. At the 1993 Australian Open she made the second round of qualifying and also featured in the main draw of the doubles, partnering Veronika Martinek.

ITF finals

Singles: 2 (0–2)

Doubles: 9 (2–7)

References

External links
 
 

1973 births
Living people
German female tennis players
West German female tennis players